was a stable of sumo wrestlers, part of the Isegahama ichimon or group of stables. In its modern form it dates from 1954 when it was re-established by former ōzeki Nayoroiwa who led it until his death in 1971. It went out of existence in 1990 when the stablemaster, former maegashira Ōnobori, reached the mandatory retirement age of sixty-five, and was absorbed by Ajigawa stable, but it was revived by Kasugafuji after his retirement as an active wrestler in 1996. As of January 2016 it had 23 wrestlers. Its only wrestler to reach the top division was the  Korean born Kasugaō who retired in 2011.

In 2012 Kasugafuji stood down as head following his election to the Sumo Association's board of directors, handing over control to the former Hamanishiki of the affiliated Oitekaze stable, and remained at Kasugayama stable under the name elder name Ikazuchi. However he resigned from the Sumo Association in September of that year.

In 2013 the current and former heads of the stable sued each other, with the former Kasugafuji who still owned the deeds to the premises claiming unpaid rent and demanding eviction, while Hamanishiki claimed the Kasugayama myoseki certificate had not been handed over as promised. Two trials proceeded on the two separate issues. A settlement was reached on the rent issue in 2015 with Hamanishiki agreeing to move the stable to another location with the same ward of Kawasaki. In August 2016 the court ordered that Hamanishiki pay Kasugafuji 171.6 million yen for the certificate. Hamanishiki appealed this decision to the Tokyo High Court.

In October 2016 the Sumo Association ordered Kasugayama to resign as stablemaster of Kasugayama stable, and that it be absorbed into Oitekaze stable, because Kasugayama's lack of a myoseki certificate meant that he was not qualified to be a stablemaster. They also criticized him for not training or guiding his wrestlers at all during the September tournament, despite being told to after being removed as a judge in August. The closure went ahead despite the stable's koenkai, or supporter's group, sending a petition to the Sumo Association demanding the decision be reversed, and eleven of the stable's wrestlers refusing to move to Oitekaze and instead submitting their retirement papers in protest.

In January 2017 Hamanishiki resigned from the Sumo Association. In the same month it was announced that the stable would be revived under the name Nakagawa stable and run by Nakagawa-oyakata (former maegashira Asahisato) who had been looking after the remaining Kasugayama stable wrestlers within Oitekaze stable.

Ring name conventions
Some wrestlers at this stable took ring names or shikona that include the characters , which are the first two characters in the stable name, and which is also in deference to Kasugayama who reestablished the stable.

Owners

2012-2016: 21st Kasugayama Takamasa (toshiyori, former maegashira 11th, Hamanishiki, Kumamoto)
1997-2012: 20th Kasugayama Yoshiaki (former maegashira 1st, Kasugafuji, Miyagi)
1991-1996: defunct
1971-1990: 16th Kasugayama Takahiro (former maegashira 1st, Ōnobori, Nagano)
1954-1971: 15th Kasugayama Shizuo (former ōzeki, Nayori'iwa, Hokkaido)
1925-1954: 14th Kasugayama Masahiro (former sekiwake, Fujinokawa , Niigata)

Coaches
Takashima Daizō (iin, former sekiwake Kōbōyama)

Notable former members
Ōnobori, during 14th and 15th owners (former maegashira 1st)
  , during 15th and 16th owners (former sekitori, or  7th)
    , during 16th owner (former Jūryō 13th)
 Kasugafuji, during 16th owner (former maegashira 1st)
Kasugaō, during 20th owner (former maegashira 3rd)

Assistant
Byakuhōyama (sewanin, former makushita, real name Fumio Izawa)

Referee
Shikimori Yodayū (makuuchi gyōji, real name Hiroshi Kikuchi)

Usher
Kōhei (sandanme yobidashi, real name Kōhei Ōyama)

Hairdressers
Tokojin (first class tokoyama)
Tokoharu (fourth class tokoyama)

See also
List of sumo stables
List of active sumo wrestlers
List of past sumo wrestlers
Glossary of sumo terms

Footnotes

Notes

References

External links
Official site 
Japan Sumo Association profile

Defunct sumo stables